A Tough Winter is a 1930 Our Gang short comedy film directed by Robert F. McGowan. It was the 99th (11th talking) Our Gang short that was released.

Plot
More a vehicle for black comedian Stepin Fetchit, the gang go to Wheezer's and Mary Ann's house to have a taffy pull. But they get the ingredients mixed up and make a huge mess. They attempt to clean up and ask Stepin to help, but he crosses wires, plumbing and gas lines. As a result, light bulbs pop, water sprays from gas heaters, a phone acts as a vacuum cleaner and music plays from the icebox.

Fetchit was actually signed to a one year contract with Hal Roach Studios to appear with the gang in 9 episodes from the 1930-31 season. He was originally written into the scripts for several episodes, including Pups Is Pups, Helping Grandma, and Little Daddy.  However, his contract was canceled for unknown reasons and the Our Gang Series continued without him.

Cast

The Gang
 Norman Chaney as Chubby
 Jackie Cooper as Jackie
 Allen Hoskins as Farina
 Bobby Hutchins as Wheezer
 Mary Ann Jackson as Mary Ann
 Beverly Parrish as Girl with Mary Ann
 Warner Weidler as Our Gang member
 Wolfgang Weidler as Our Gang member
 Pete the Pup as himself
 Dinah the Mule as herself
 Tommy Atkins as Toddler (unconfirmed)

Additional cast
 Stepin Fetchit as Stepin
 Lyle Tayo as Miss Radio

Production notes
The first Pete the Pup was poisoned by an unknown assailant after this film. Because of perceived racism toward African Americans, A Tough Winter was eliminated from the syndicated Little Rascals television package in 1971. Also Beverly Parrish was signed for two years to be on Our Gang films to replace Jean Darling who was dismissed 6 months before but she died suddenly a week and a half after this episode was filmed. Shirley Jean Rickett wound up replacing her several episodes later though she lasted only half a season as well. This was the last episode to feature an Orchestral Music Scoring and the last to feature the theme song That Old Gang Of Mine on the credits. The film also was the first to feature a couple of Leroy Shield jazz type pieces which would become a big part of Our Gang episodes right after on their next film.

See also
 Our Gang filmography

References

External links
 

1930 films
1930 comedy films
American black-and-white films
Films directed by Robert F. McGowan
Hal Roach Studios short films
Our Gang films
1930s American films
1930s English-language films